Tsuyoshi Yoshida (1924 – January 5, 1988), known by the pen name , was a Japanese homoerotic fetish artist and founder of the magazine . He is noted for his illustrations of "macho-type" men, often with yakuza-inspired irezumi tattoos. Mishima, along with Tatsuji Okawa, Sanshi Funayama, and Go Hirano, is regarded by artist and historian Gengoroh Tagame as a central figure in the first wave of contemporary gay artists in Japan.

Biography
Mishima was born in 1924 in Yokosuka, Kanagawa Prefecture. At 18, he was drafted into the Imperial Japanese Army, where he had his first homosexual experience with his commanding officer. Upon the end of the Second World War in 1945, Mishima relocated to Tokyo, where he immersed himself in the nascent gay nightlife of the city. Many bars and nightclubs during this era were operated by the yakuza; Mishima's fascination with their crew cut hairstyles and irezumi tattoos would figure heavily into his art.

During the late 1950s, Mishima discovered the art of Tom of Finland, who came to influence his own work. In 1955, Mishima met the writer Yukio Mishima at a gym, and formed a friendship on their shared interest in athletics, bodybuilding, and hypermasculine sexuality. The two men drew artistic nudes together as a pastime; Go Mishima began to pursue a career in homoerotic art in earnest with Yukio Mishima's encouragement, and adopted Mishima's last name to use as his pen name in tribute. After Yukio Mishima's death by ritual suicide, Go Mishima began to depict more violent material and themes in his art, including bondage, masochism, and torture.

He was an early contributor to Barazoku, which in 1971 became the first commercially circulated gay magazine in Japan. Dissatisfied with the bishōnen art style of Barazoku, Mishima founded  in 1974, which focused on images of masculine men, and was more explicitly pornographic.

On January 5, 1988, Mishima died of complications from cirrhosis. A commemorative issue of Barazoku was published in tribute to Mishima in 1989, in which Sadao Hasegawa referred to him as "a master illustrator of the male physique." The first solo exhibition of Mishima's art was held in 1999, at Gallery Naruyama in Tokyo.

See also
 Homosexuality in Japan

References

1924 births
1988 deaths
20th-century Japanese painters
Deaths from cirrhosis
Fetish artists
Gay male BDSM
Japanese erotic artists
Japanese gay artists
Pseudonymous artists
Imperial Japanese Army personnel of World War II
Gay military personnel
20th-century Japanese LGBT people